Myersiohyla inparquesi is a species of frog in the family Hylidae.  It appears to be endemic to the summit of Cerro Marahuaca, a tepui in central Amazonas state, Venezuela.
Its natural habitats are tepui shrub and forests. Tadpoles live in fast-flowing streams.

References

inparquesi
Frogs of South America
Endemic fauna of Venezuela
Amphibians of Venezuela
Guayana Highlands
Amphibians described in 1994
Taxa named by Josefa Celsa Señaris
Taxonomy articles created by Polbot
Amphibians of the Tepuis